The Caesar Line was the last German line of defence in Italy before Rome during the Italian Campaign of the Second World War. It extended from the west coast near Ostia, over the Alban Hills south of Rome, from Valmontone to Avezzano and then to Pescara on the Adriatic coast. Behind the western half of the line was a subsidiary line, the Roman switch line which took a path north of Rome.

When the Caesar C Line defences, manned by the German 14th Army, were breached by the U.S. Fifth Army on 30 May 1944, following the breakout from Anzio, the road to Rome was finally opened. The Germans retreated to their next line of defence, the Trasimene Line where the 14th Army re-aligned with the German 10th Army before withdrawing to the formidable defences of the Gothic Line.

See also
Battle of Anzio

German World War II defensive lines
Italian campaign (World War II)
World War II sites in Italy